Riara University   is a Private University located along Mbagathi Way in Nairobi, Kenya.

Location
The university's main campus is just next to Nyayo Highrise Estate in Kibera, Nairobi County, a fifteen minutes drive from Nairobi Central Business District.

Foundation
Riara University was founded in 2012 by Mr. Daniel Gachukia and Dr. Eddah Gachukia. The couple are also the Founding Directors of The Riara Group of Schools, which comprises two Kindergartens, two Primary Schools, and a Girls’ Secondary School.

Accredation
The university is established under the Universities Act (2012), having been approved by the Commission for University Education to operate under a Letter of Interim Authority since 2 August 2012.
In accordance with the provisions of the Act, the university is in the process of accreditation for Award of Full Charter and has already undergone the Technical Inspection by the Commission for University Education. The institution is hopeful that the Charter will be approved soon.

The university is fully accredited by the Council of Legal Education. The Council of Legal Education (CLE) is the statutory regulator of Legal Education and Training in Kenya, among other functions as stipulated in the Legal Education Act (2012). The university holds Full Accreditation status from the Kenya Accountants and Secretaries National Examinations Board (KASNEB) as a Training Centre as well as an Examinations Centre. The university runs Certified Public Accountant (CPA), Certified Secretary (CS), and Accounting Technicians Diploma (ATD) courses under this accreditation.

In 2021, the ministry of education introduced the Teacher Professional Development Program (TPD), all teachers employed by the Teachers Service Commission are to undergo the training. Riara University is one of the universities in Kenya that is offering this program. This is supposed to help in teachers performance appraisal and development an issue that stakeholders in the education sector more so teachers have different views on it.

Governance 
Governance of the school includes the following people:

Board of Trustees
Prof. Eddah Gachukia 
Daniel Gachukia
Suzanne Gachukia
Kimani Mathu
Lawrence Mungai 
Margaret W. Wanjohi 
James Waiboci

Faculties
The university offers undergraduate programs at the following schools:
 School of Education
 School of Computing Sciences
 School of Business
 Law School
 School of International Relations and Diplomacy
 School of Communication and Multimedia Journalism

Riara University Library
The University Library hosts more than 6,700 print volumes, 75 journals, 35,000 e-databases as well as Wi-Fi internet access.

References

Universities and colleges in Kenya
Educational institutions established in 2012
2012 establishments in Kenya